The Men's 4 × 100 metre freestyle relay competition at the 2017 World Championships was held on 23 July 2017.

Records
Prior to the competition, the existing world and championship records were as follows.

Results

Heats
The heats were held at 11:50.

Final
The final was held at 18:52.

References

Men's 4 x 100 metre freestyle relay